Pachelbel (or ) is the surname of several people:

Johann Pachelbel (1653–1706), German composer
Wilhelm Hieronymus Pachelbel (c. 1685–1764), German composer, son of Johann
Amalia Pachelbel (1688–1723), German painter and engraver, daughter of Johann
Charles Theodore Pachelbel (1690–1750), German composer, son of Johann